WCLD-FM is an Urban Contemporary formatted broadcast radio station.  The station is licensed to Cleveland, Mississippi and serves Cleveland, Clarksdale, Greenville, Greenwood, and Indianola in Mississippi.  WCLD-FM is owned by Radio Cleveland, Inc.

References

External links
 Jammin' 104 on Facebook
 

1972 establishments in Mississippi
Urban contemporary radio stations in the United States
Radio stations established in 1972
CLD-FM